Victor Gabriel da Conceição Ribeiro (born 28 April, 2004), known as just Victor Gabriel, is a Brazilian professional soccer player who plays as a defender for Sport Recife.

References

External links

2004 births
Living people
Brazilian footballers
Association football defenders
Sport Club do Recife players
Campeonato Brasileiro Série A players